The Schussen is a  tributary of the Bodensee (Lake Constance), which drains to the Rhine, in the southern portion of Upper Swabia in Baden-Württemberg (Germany).

Course 

From its source, not far from the Lake Feder, around 1.5 kilometers north of Bad Schussenried, where it runs down the watershed between the Rhine and the Danube, to the Bodensee.

The river passes south of Aulendorf through its own valley in the northern part of the Altdorf Forests, through the Schussen ravine by Durlesbach and by Mochewangen (Wolpertswende), and from there into the broad Schussen Valley.  The valley was not created by the river itself, but rather during one of the Ice Ages.  From there it runs past the small city of Weingarten, and, further, by Ravensburg and through the district of Meckenbeuren, before it enters the Bodensee water in the region of Eriskirch, at the Eriskircher wetlands.

Tributaries 
Several streams enter the Schussen, including the Wolfegger Ach, which originates between Binningen and Niederbiegen (both are part of the community of Baienfurt).  Other tributaries include the Scherzach, Scharzach, and the Ravensburg city creek.

Oddities 
In the course of its passage through the County of Biberach, the Schussen is the only stream that flows south to the Bodensee; all others flow north to the Danube.

References

External links

Rivers of Baden-Württemberg
Bodenseekreis
 
Swabia
Upper Swabia
Rivers of Germany